Antonio Olmo Ramírez (born 18 January 1954) is a Spanish retired football defender and manager.

Club career
Olmo was born in Sabadell, Barcelona, Catalonia. A loan spell with amateurs FC Calella notwithstanding, he played his entire senior career with FC Barcelona, his first two seasons being spent with the B-team in Segunda División. He made his La Liga debut on 5 September 1976 in a 4–0 home win against UD Las Palmas, going on to be first-choice in that and the following five seasons, often partnering Migueli as stopper.

During his spell with the Blaugrana, Olmo won a total of seven major titles, including three Copa del Rey trophies and two UEFA Cup Winners' Cup tournaments, contributing with 16 games and one goal combined to the latter conquests. He retired in June 1984, at the age of only 30.

As a manager, Olmo was connected to two clubs, Barcelona and hometown's CE Sabadell FC, in various levels. In 1991–92, with the latter, he had his first and only experience at the professional level, being one of three coaches during the campaign for the ninth-placed team.

International career
Olmo earned 13 caps for Spain during three years, his debut coming on 9 February 1977 in a 1–0 friendly win in the Republic of Ireland. He was selected to the 1978 FIFA World Cup squad, appearing against Brazil (0–0) and Sweden (1–0 win) in an eventual group stage exit.

Olmo also represented the nation at the 1976 Summer Olympics and UEFA Euro 1980.

Personal life
Olmo's son, Aitor, was also a footballer and a defender. He never played in higher than Segunda División B during his career, representing mainly CE Mataró.

Honours
Barcelona
Copa del Rey: 1977–78, 1980–81, 1982–83
Supercopa de España: 1983
Copa de la Liga: 1983
UEFA Cup Winners' Cup: 1978–79, 1981–82

References

External links

1954 births
Living people
Sportspeople from Sabadell
Spanish footballers
Footballers from Catalonia
Association football defenders
La Liga players
Segunda División players
Tercera División players
FC Barcelona Atlètic players
FC Barcelona players
Spain youth international footballers
Spain under-23 international footballers
Spain amateur international footballers
Spain international footballers
1978 FIFA World Cup players
UEFA Euro 1980 players
Olympic footballers of Spain
Footballers at the 1976 Summer Olympics
Spanish football managers
Segunda División managers
CE Sabadell FC managers